Mayssa Maghrebi (born August 19, 1983, in Meknes) is an Emirati-Moroccan actress. She started working in 2000. She acted in several Egyptian, Saudi, Kuwaiti, Qatari and Emirati television series.

References 

1978 births
Living people
People from Meknes
Moroccan actresses
Emirati actresses
Emirati people of Moroccan descent
Naturalized citizens of the United Arab Emirates